Hard to Be Me is an independently produced comedy-drama television pilot created by and starring Edward Robert Bach. The show follows second-year art student Kevin Hamilton (Bach) and his vlog in which he tells the story of his week through art.

This framing device led to Hard to Be Me being called "the first web 2.0 television show" and was cited by the director of the pilot episode Erik Cieslewicz as one of the main reasons he worked on the project. It was described as "a little Gilmore Girls a little Everybody Hates Chris", which was called a major component of the show by the pilot's creators.

Hard to Be Me won a "slew of awards at film festivals" and was also pitched to several networks, ultimately landing on Amazon Prime.

Synopsis
Using the framing device of Kevin's video blog, the pilot follows Kevin receiving the weekly assignment of creating the blog from his demanding Communications 101 professor Dr. Candice Wilkes (Biggs). His first blog, introducing his family and friends, introduces the audience to the universe of the show as well. The show also follows a group of characters, who -- like the audience -- are watching Kevin's blog as part of the narrative of the show.

Cast
 Edward Robert Bach as Kevin Hamilton
 Kendra North as Patricia Hamilton
 Katie E. Jones as Shannon Hamilton
 Michael Garvey as Patrick Hamilton
 Ali Walton as Olivia Willis-Henshall
 Doug Henderson as Daniel Corrigan
 Megan Hurst as Juliet Crawford
 Kelli Biggs as Dr. Candice Wilkes
 Estenia Goodridge as Melody
 Carleen Troy as Shareece
 Brandon Rice as Malcolm

Production
Bach stated that "There is definitely some of me in the plot and character developed around Kevin" and that he hoped "Viewers will see themselves in all the characters" as well. It took approximately a year from start to finish to produce the pilot episode. Bach stated numerous times that he would like the characters in the show to be relatable and empathetic while the plots to be universal and family friendly. Additionally, the reason to set the show in Washington, D.C. was to show "the softer, non-political side of DC and the people who live here."

According to Cieslewicz, "the goal from the beginning was to create a broadcast-ready pilot", and that the production considered "hundreds" of actors from the Washington, D.C. area when casting. Kevin's favorite artist in the show is also one of Bach's as well: Drew Struzan. According to Bach, Struzan "liked the idea of the Pilot" and his self-portrait appears in the pilot.

In August 2010, the show reached an agreement with Cyndi Lauper to provide her track "It's Hard to Be Me" as the theme song of the show. Before that date, and beginning again in 2020, the theme song for the show is  " Ready or Not " by Long Since Forgotten.

Release
As of June 29, 2020, the Pilot episode of "Hard to Be Me" is available to stream on Amazon Prime.

Reception
In addition to calling the pilot "the first web 2.0 TV show", The Wausau City Pages also described it as "giving a truly unique perspective on youth, life and social media technology." Blogger William Powell declared in his review that the show was "directed with crisp professionalism by Erik Cieslewicz" and that "Hard To Be Me is a pilot that will probably wind up on the small screen on a major network soon. Mark my words."

Awards  

|-
| 2011
| Best Dramedy
| New York International Independent Film and Video Festival
| 
| Short Category
|
|-
| 2011
| Silver Award
| California Film Awards
| 
| TV Pilot Category
|
|-
| 2010
| Best TV Pilot
| New York International Independent Film and Video Festival
| 
|
|
|-
| 2010
| Leading ActorLeading ActressTV Pilot
| Accolade Competition
| 
| Edward Robert BachKendra NorthAward of Excellence
|

References

External links
 
 
 View on Amazon Prime

English-language television shows
2010 American television series debuts
2010s American comedy-drama television series
2020s American comedy-drama television series
Television shows set in Washington, D.C.
Unaired television pilots